Keith Gordon Downing (born 23 July 1965) is an English former footballer and football manager. He made the vast majority of his appearances for Wolverhampton Wanderers.

A former Chelsea youth team player, he moved from Mile Oak Rovers into the English Football League with Notts County in 1984. Three years later he joined Wolverhampton Wanderers. He spent six years with Wolves, winning the Football League Trophy in 1988 and successive Fourth Division and Third Division titles in 1987–88 and 1988–89. He joined Birmingham City in 1993, before moving on to Stoke City the following year. In 1995, he joined Hereford United via Cardiff City, and retired in 1999.

Downing went on to become a coach, and also spent September 2007 to November 2008 as Cheltenham Town manager, and served West Bromwich Albion as caretaker-manager for a brief spell in the 2013–14 Premier League season. He was appointed England U20 head coach in July 2015, and then took up the same role at the England U19's 13 months later, whom he led to the 2017 UEFA European Under-19 Championship title.

Playing career

Early career
Downing was a junior player at Chelsea, but left Stamford Bridge at the end of the 1982–83 season. He went on to spend a season with Mile Oak Rovers. He began his professional career in 1984 at Richie Barker's Notts County, who went on to be relegated out of the Second Division at the end of the 1984–85 season. The "Magpies" finished eighth in the Third Division in the 1985–86 season and then seventh in 1986–87 under the stewardship of Jimmy Sirrel.

Wolverhampton Wanderers
He left Meadow Lane and moved on to Graham Turner's Wolverhampton Wanderers in 1987. Wolves won promotion as champions of the Fourth Division in 1987–88, and Downing also played in the 1988 Football League Trophy final victory over Burnley at Wembley Stadium. Wolves won a second successive promotion in the 1988–89 season, winning the Third Division title by an eight-point margin. The club made a push for promotion out of the Second Division in 1989–90, but ended up in tenth place, seven points outside of the play-off places. Downing appeared 35 times in both the 1990–91 and 1991–92 seasons, as Wolves finished in 12th and then 11th position. He played 37 times in the 1992–93 campaign before leaving Molineux in the summer.

Later career
In July 1993 Downing moved to Birmingham City. However, he featured only twice for Blues in the 1993–94 season, and left St Andrew's in the summer. He remained in the Midlands and the First Division for the 1994–95 season, playing 24 games for Stoke City. He began the 1995–96 season with Cardiff City, before being reunited with Graham Turner at Hereford United in September 1995. The "Bulls" finished sixth in the Third Division in the 1995–96 campaign, losing to Darlington in the play-offs. He made 13 appearances in the 1996–97 campaign as Hereford dropped out of the Football League with a last place finish. He became player-coach in 1998 and subsequently returned to Wolves as a youth team coach in March 1999.

Managerial career

Cheltenham Town
Downing joined Cheltenham Town as assistant manager in July 2004, working alongside manager John Ward, who he had met through his time at Wolverhampton Wanderers where Ward had been assistant manager. When Ward left the club to join Carlisle United in October 2007, Downing stepped in as caretaker manager, before being given the position on a full-time basis on 2 November. He endured a difficult start to his management career, but was aided by three loan signings from Bristol City in the January transfer window – Steve Brooker, Alex Russell and Richard Keogh, as well as free agent defender Alan Wright. Cheltenham avoided relegation on the last day of the 2007–08 season with a 2–1 victory over Doncaster Rovers at Whaddon Road. However they struggled after striker Steven Gillespie was sold to Colchester United for £400,000. Downing left the club by mutual consent on 13 September 2008 with the "Robins" bottom of League One.

Coaching spell
In February 2009, he was appointed assistant manager at League Two side Port Vale. This was a temporary appointment to help manager Dean Glover, and both men left the club in May 2009. In July 2009, Downing was appointed the academy coach at West Bromwich Albion. He served as joint-assistant head coach for the "Baggies" under Steve Clarke and in December 2013 temporarily took over first team duties at the Premier League club after Clarke was sacked and before Pepe Mel was appointed as manager early the following month. He was not a popular figure with fans at The Hawthorns due to his years of service at Black Country derby rivals Wolves. However his UEFA Pro Licence and popularity with the players made him a serious candidate to replace Mel in the summer. Alan Irvine got the job however, and Downing left the club in January 2015 following a backroom reshuffle by new boss Tony Pulis.

England youth
Downing was appointed head coach of the England U20 team in July 2015, initially on an interim basis. His appointed was made permanent in February 2016. He changed roles to become head coach of the England U19 team in August 2016. He led the under-19s to victory in the 2017 UEFA European Under-19 Championship with a 2–1 victory over Portugal. He was a part of Gareth Southgate's scouting team at the 2018 FIFA World Cup in Russia. Downing left his post in August 2020 to join Championship club Bristol City as an assistant head coach to Dean Holden.

EFL coach
Downing left Bristol City in October 2021. He was appointed as first team head coach at Plymouth Argyle in December 2021, working under manager Steven Schumacher, who clarified that "Keith has come in as my No 2, if you like". Downing left the club at the end of the 2021–22 season, much to director of football Neil Dewsnip's disappointment. In July 2022, Downing returned to Birmingham City as one of two assistants to newly appointed head coach John Eustace.

Personal life
Downing married in 1993, and has two sons from that marriage. He is a cousin of Judas Priest guitarist K. K. Downing. He has an interest in criminology and history, specifically the history of World War II.

Career statistics

Managerial statistics

Honours

as a Player
Wolverhampton Wanderers
Football League Fourth Division: 1987–88
Football League Trophy: 1988
Football League Third Division: 1988–89

as a Manager
England U19
UEFA European Under-19 Championship: 2017

References

1965 births
Living people
People from Oldbury, West Midlands
English footballers
Association football midfielders
Chelsea F.C. players
Mile Oak Rovers F.C. players
Notts County F.C. players
Wolverhampton Wanderers F.C. players
Birmingham City F.C. players
Stoke City F.C. players
Cardiff City F.C. players
Hereford United F.C. players
English Football League players
National League (English football) players
Cheltenham Town F.C. non-playing staff
English football managers
Association football coaches
Cheltenham Town F.C. managers
Port Vale F.C. non-playing staff
West Bromwich Albion F.C. non-playing staff
Bristol City F.C. non-playing staff
Plymouth Argyle F.C. non-playing staff
Birmingham City F.C. non-playing staff
English Football League managers
Premier League managers